= Palais Hongran =

Historic mansion in Nice, France

Coordinates: 43.6956°N 7.2730°E

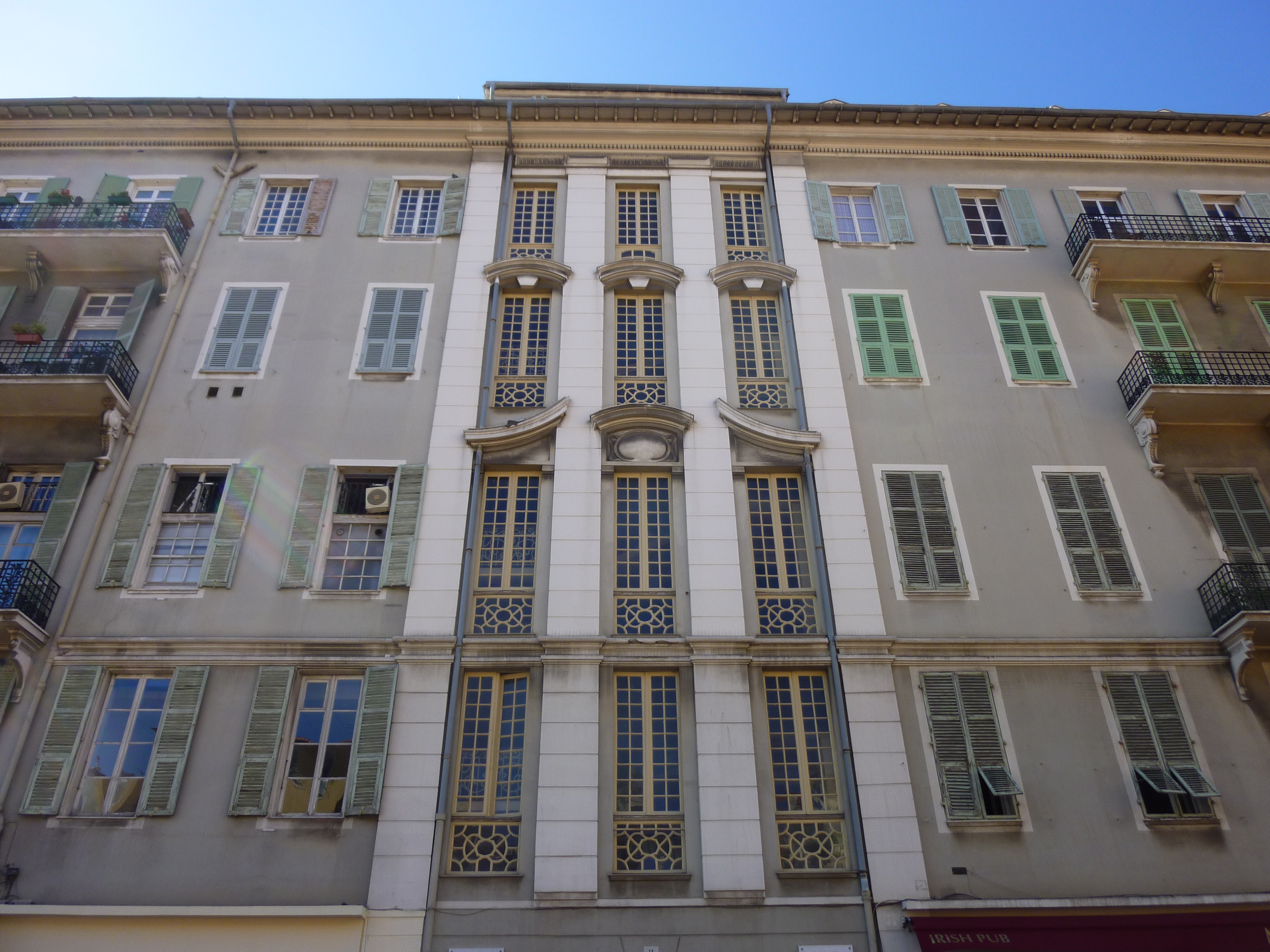
Palais Hongran.

The Palais Hongran is a historic mansion in Nice, Alpes-Maritimes, France. It was built from 1769 to 1772. It has been listed as an official national monument since December 2, 2010.
